Brian Cartledge (3 March 1941 – 22 October 2004) was an Australian cricketer. He played four first-class matches for Tasmania between 1970 and 1973.

See also
 List of Tasmanian representative cricketers

References

External links
 

1941 births
2004 deaths
Australian cricketers
Tasmania cricketers
Cricketers from Tasmania